The history of radar (where radar stands for radio detection and ranging) started with experiments by Heinrich Hertz in the late 19th century that showed that radio waves were reflected by metallic objects. This possibility was suggested in James Clerk Maxwell's seminal work on electromagnetism. However, it was not until the early 20th century that systems able to use these principles were becoming widely available, and it was German inventor Christian Hülsmeyer who first used them to build a simple ship detection device intended to help avoid collisions in fog (Reichspatent Nr. 165546). 
True radar, such as the British Chain Home early warning system provided directional information to objects over short ranges, were developed over the next two decades.

The development of systems able to produce short pulses of radio energy was the key advance that allowed modern radar systems to come into existence. By timing the pulses on an oscilloscope, the range could be determined and the direction of the antenna revealed the angular location of the targets. The two, combined, produced a "fix", locating the target relative to the antenna. In the 1934–1939 period, eight nations developed independently, and in great secrecy, systems of this type: the United Kingdom, Germany, the United States, the USSR, Japan, the Netherlands, France, and Italy. In addition, Britain shared their information with the United States and four Commonwealth countries: Australia, Canada, New Zealand, and South Africa, and these countries also developed their own radar systems. During the war, Hungary was added to this list. The term RADAR was coined in 1939 by the United States Signal Corps as it worked on these systems for the Navy.

Progress during the war was rapid and of great importance, probably one of the decisive factors for the victory of the Allies. A key development was the magnetron in the UK, which allowed the creation of relatively small systems with sub-meter resolution. By the end of hostilities, Britain, Germany, the United States, the USSR, and Japan had a wide variety of land- and sea-based radars as well as small airborne systems. After the war, radar use was widened to numerous fields including: civil aviation, marine navigation, radar guns for police, meteorology and even medicine. Key developments in the post-war period include the travelling wave tube as a way to produce large quantities of coherent microwaves, the development of signal delay systems that led to phased array radars, and ever-increasing frequencies that allow higher resolutions. Increases in signal processing capability due to the introduction of solid state computers has also had a large impact on radar use.

Significance 
The place of radar in the larger story of science and technology is argued differently by different authors. On the one hand, radar contributed very little to theory, which was largely known since the days of Maxwell and Hertz. Therefore, radar did not advance science, but was simply a matter of technology and engineering. Maurice Ponte, one of the developers of radar in France, states:

But others point out the immense practical consequences of the development of radar. Far more than the atomic bomb, radar contributed to the Allied victory in World War II. Robert Buderi states that it was also the precursor of much modern technology. From a review of his book:
In later years radar was used in scientific instruments, such as weather radar and radar astronomy.

Early contributors

Heinrich Hertz
In 1886–1888 the German physicist Heinrich Hertz conducted his series of experiments that proved the existence of electromagnetic waves (including radio waves), predicted in equations developed in 1862–4 by the Scottish physicist James Clerk Maxwell. In Hertz's 1887 experiment he found that these waves would transmit through different types of materials and also would reflect off metal surfaces in his lab as well as conductors and dielectrics. The nature of these waves being similar to visible light in their ability to be reflected, refracted, and polarized would be shown by Hertz and subsequent experiments by other physicists.

Guglielmo Marconi 
Radio pioneer Guglielmo Marconi noticed radio waves were being reflected back to the transmitter by objects in radio beacon experiments he conducted on March 3, 1899 on Salisbury Plain. In 1916 he and British engineer Charles Samuel Franklin used short-waves in their experiments, critical to the practical development of radar. He would relate his findings 6 years later in a 1922 paper delivered before the Institution of Electrical Engineers in London:

Christian Hülsmeyer
In 1904, Christian Hülsmeyer gave public demonstrations in Germany and the Netherlands of the use of radio echoes to detect ships so that collisions could be avoided. His device consisted of a simple spark gap used to generate a signal that was aimed using a dipole antenna with a cylindrical parabolic reflector. When a signal reflected from a ship was picked up by a similar antenna attached to the separate coherer receiver, a bell sounded. During bad weather or fog, the device would be periodically spun to check for nearby ships. It did not provide range (distance) information, only warning of a nearby object. He patented the device, called the telemobiloscope, but due to lack of interest by the naval authorities the invention was not put into production.

Hülsmeyer also received a patent amendment for estimating the range to the ship. Using a vertical scan of the horizon with the telemobiloscope mounted on a tower, the operator would find the angle at which the return was the most intense and deduce, by simple triangulation, the approximate distance. This is in contrast to the later development of pulsed radar, which determines distance via two-way transit time of the pulse.

United Kingdom

In 1915, Robert Watson Watt joined the Meteorological Office as a meteorologist, working at an outstation at Aldershot in Hampshire. Over the next 20 years, he studied atmospheric phenomena and developed the use of radio signals generated by lightning strikes to map out the position of thunderstorms. The difficulty in pinpointing the direction of these fleeting signals using rotatable directional antennas led, in 1923, to the use of oscilloscopes in order to display the signals. The operation eventually moved to the outskirts of Slough in Berkshire, and in 1927 formed the Radio Research Station (RRS), Slough, an entity under the Department of Scientific and Industrial Research (DSIR). Watson Watt was appointed the RRS Superintendent.

As war clouds gathered over Britain, the likelihood of air raids and the threat of invasion by air and sea drove a major effort in applying science and technology to defence. In November 1934, the Air Ministry established the Committee for the Scientific Survey of Air Defence (CSSAD) with the official function of considering "how far recent advances in scientific and technical knowledge can be used to strengthen the present methods of defence against hostile aircraft". Commonly called the "Tizard Committee" after its Chairman, Sir Henry Tizard, this group had a profound influence on technical developments in Britain.

H. E. Wimperis, Director of Scientific Research at the Air Ministry and a member of the Tizard Committee, had read about a German newspaper article claiming that the Germans had built a death ray using radio signals, accompanied by an image of a very large radio antenna. Both concerned and potentially excited by this possibility, but highly skeptical at the same time, Wimperis looked for an expert in the field of radio propagation who might be able to pass judgement on the concept. Watt, Superintendent of the RRS, was now well established as an authority in the field of radio, and in January 1935, Wimperis contacted him asking if radio might be used for such a device. After discussing this with his scientific assistant, Arnold F. 'Skip' Wilkins, Wilkins quickly produced a back-of-the-envelope calculation that showed the energy required would be enormous. Watt wrote back that this was unlikely, but added the following comment: "Attention is being turned to the still difficult, but less unpromising, problem of radio detection and numerical considerations on the method of detection by reflected radio waves will be submitted when required".

Over the following several weeks, Wilkins considered the radio detection problem. He outlined an approach and backed it with detailed calculations of necessary transmitter power, reflection characteristics of an aircraft, and needed receiver sensitivity. He proposed using a directional receiver based on Watt's lightning detection concept, listening for powerful signals from a separate transmitter. Timing, and thus distance measurements, would be accomplished by triggering the oscilloscope's trace with a muted signal from the transmitter, and then simply measuring the returns against a scale. Watson Watt sent this information to the Air Ministry on February 12, 1935, in a secret report titled "The Detection of Aircraft by Radio Methods".

Reflection of radio signals was critical to the proposed technique, and the Air Ministry asked if this could be proven. To test this, Wilkins set up receiving equipment in a field near Upper Stowe, Northamptonshire. On February 26, 1935, a Handley Page Heyford bomber flew along a path between the receiving station and the transmitting towers of a BBC shortwave station in nearby Daventry. This convincing test, known as the Daventry Experiment, was witnessed by a representative from the Air Ministry, and led to the immediate authorization to build a full demonstration system. This experiment was later reproduced by Wilkins for the 1977 BBC television series The Secret War episode "To See a Hundred Miles".

Based on pulsed transmission as used for probing the ionosphere, a preliminary system was designed and built at the RRS by the team. Their existing transmitter had a peak power of about 1 kW, and Wilkins had estimated that 100 kW would be needed. Edward George Bowen was added to the team to design and build such a transmitter. Bowens’ transmitter operated at 6 MHz (50 m), had a pulse-repetition rate of 25 Hz, a pulse width of 25 μs, and approached the desired power.

Orfordness, a narrow  peninsula in Suffolk along the coast of the North Sea, was selected as the test site. Here the equipment would be openly operated in the guise of an ionospheric monitoring station. In mid-May 1935, the equipment was moved to Orfordness. Six wooden towers were erected, two for stringing the transmitting antenna, and four for corners of crossed receiving antennas. In June, general testing of the equipment began.

On June 17, the first target was detected—a Supermarine Scapa flying boat at  range. It is historically correct that, on June 17, 1935, radio-based detection and ranging was first demonstrated in Britain . Watson Watt, Wilkins, and Bowen are generally credited with initiating what would later be called radar in this nation.

In December 1935, the British Treasury appropriated £60,000 for a five-station system called Chain Home (CH), covering approaches to the Thames Estuary. The secretary of the Tizard Committee, Albert Percival Rowe, coined the acronym RDF as a cover for the work, meaning Range and Direction Finding but suggesting the already well-known Radio Direction Finding.

Late in 1935, responding to Lindemann's recognition of the need for night detection and interception gear, and realizing existing transmitters were too heavy for aircraft, Bowen proposed fitting only receivers, what would later be called bistatic radar. Frederick Lindemann's proposals for infrared sensors and aerial mines would prove impractical. It would take Bowen's efforts, at the urging of Tizard, who became increasingly concerned about the need, to see Air to Surface Vessel (ASV), and through it Airborne Interception (AI), radar to fruition.

In 1937, Bowen's team set their crude ASV radar, the world's first airborne set, to detect the Home Fleet in dismal weather. Only in spring 1939, "as a matter of great urgency" after the failure of the searchlight system Silhouette, did attention turn to using ASV for air-to-air interception (AI). Demonstrated in June 1939, AI got a warm reception from Air Chief Marshal Hugh Dowding, and even more so from Churchill. This proved problematic. Its accuracy, dependent on the height of the aircraft, meant that CH, capable of only , was not accurate enough to place an aircraft within its detection range, and an additional system was required. Its wooden chassis had a disturbing tendency to catch fire (even with attention from expert technicians), so much so that Dowding, when told that Watson-Watt could provide hundreds of sets, demanded "ten that work". The Cossor and MetroVick sets were overweight for aircraft use and the RAF lacked night fighter pilots, observers, and suitable aircraft.

In 1940, John Randall and Harry Boot developed the cavity magnetron, which made ten-centimetre ( wavelength ) radar a reality. This device, the size of a small dinner plate, could be carried easily on aircraft and the short wavelength meant the antenna would also be small and hence suitable for mounting on aircraft. The short wavelength and high power made it very effective at spotting submarines from the air.

To aid Chain Home in making height calculations, at Dowding's request, the Electrical Calculator Type Q (commonly called the "Fruit Machine") was introduced in 1940.

The solution to night intercepts would be provided by Dr. W. B. "Ben" Lewis, who proposed a new, more accurate ground control display, the Plan Position Indicator (PPI), a new Ground-Controlled Interception (GCI) radar, and reliable AI radar. The AI sets would ultimately be built by EMI. GCI was unquestionably delayed by Watson-Watt's opposition to it and his belief that CH was sufficient, as well as by Bowen's preference for using ASV for navigation, despite Bomber Command disclaiming a need for it, and by Tizard's reliance on the faulty Silhouette system.

Air Ministry

In March 1936, the work at Orfordness was moved to Bawdsey Manor, nearby on the mainland. Until this time, the work had officially still been under the DSIR, but was now transferred to the Air Ministry. At the new Bawdsey Research Station, the Chain Home (CH) equipment was assembled as a prototype. There were equipment problems when the Royal Air Force (RAF) first exercised the prototype station in September 1936. These were cleared by the next April, and the Air Ministry started plans for a larger network of stations.
 
Initial hardware at CH stations was as follows: The transmitter operated on four pre-selected frequencies between 20 and 55 MHz, adjustable within 15 seconds, and delivered a peak power of 200 kW. The pulse duration was adjustable between 5 and 25 μs, with a repetition rate selectable as either 25 or 50 Hz. For synchronization of all CH transmitters, the pulse generator was locked to the 50 Hz of the British power grid. Four  steel towers supported transmitting antennas, and four  wooden towers supported cross-dipole arrays at three different levels. A goniometer was used to improve the directional accuracy from the multiple receiving antennas.

By the summer of 1937, 20 initial CH stations were in check-out operation. A major RAF exercise was performed before the end of the year, and was such a success that £10,000,000 was appropriated by the Treasury for an eventual full chain of coastal stations. At the start of 1938, the RAF took over control of all CH stations, and the network began regular operations.

In May 1938, Rowe replaced Watson Watt as Superintendent at Bawdsey. In addition to the work on CH and successor systems, there was now major work in airborne RDF equipment. This was led by E. G. Bowen and centered on 200-MHz (1.5 m) sets. The higher frequency allowed smaller antennas, appropriate for aircraft installation.

From the initiation of RDF work at Orfordness, the Air Ministry had kept the British Army and the Royal Navy generally informed; this led to both of these forces having their own RDF developments.

British Army
In 1931, at the Woolwich Research Station of the Army's Signals Experimental Establishment (SEE), W. A. S. Butement and P. E. Pollard had examined pulsed 600 MHz (50-cm) signals for detection of ships. Although they prepared a memorandum on this subject and performed preliminary experiments, for undefined reasons the War Office did not give it consideration.

As the Air Ministry's work on RDF progressed, Colonel Peter Worlledge of the Royal Engineer and Signals Board met with Watson Watt and was briefed on the RDF equipment and techniques being developed at Orfordness. His report, "The Proposed Method of Aeroplane Detection and Its Prospects", led the SEE to set up an "Army Cell" at Bawdsey in October 1936. This was under E. Talbot Paris and the staff included Butement and Pollard. The Cell's work emphasize two general types of RDF equipment: gun-laying (GL) systems for assisting anti-aircraft guns and searchlights, and coastal- defense (CD) systems for directing coastal artillery and defense of Army bases overseas.

Pollard led the first project, a gun-laying RDF code-named Mobile Radio Unit (MRU). This truck-mounted system was designed as a small version of a CH station. It operated at 23 MHz (13 m) with a power of 300 kW. A single  tower supported a transmitting antenna, as well as two receiving antennas set orthogonally for estimating the signal bearing. In February 1937, a developmental unit detected an aircraft at a range of 60 miles (96 km). The Air Ministry also adopted this system as a mobile auxiliary to the CH system.

In early 1938, Butement started the development of a CD system based on Bowen's evolving 200-MHz (1.5-m) airborne sets. The transmitter had a 400 Hz pulse rate, a 2-μs pulse width, and 50 kW power (later increased to 150 kW). Although many of Bowen's transmitter and receiver components were used, the system would not be airborne so there were no limitations on antenna size.
 
Primary credit for introducing beamed RDF systems in Britain must be given to Butement. This could be rotated at a speed up to 1.5 revolutions per minute. For greater directional accuracy, lobe switching on the receiving antennas was adopted. As a part of this development, he formulated the first – at least in Britain – mathematical relationship that would later become well known as the "radar range equation".

Royal Navy
Although the Royal Navy maintained close contact with the Air Ministry work at Bawdsey, they chose to establish their own RDF development at the Experimental Department of His Majesty's Signal School (HMSS) in Portsmouth, Hampshire, on the south coast.

HMSS started RDF work in September 1935. Initial efforts, under R. F. Yeo, were in frequencies between 75 MHz (4 m) and 1.2 GHz (25 cm). All of the work was under the utmost secrecy; it could not even be discussed with other scientists and engineers at Portsmouth. A 75 MHz range-only set was eventually developed and designated Type 79X. Basic tests were done using a training ship, but the operation was unsatisfactory.

In August 1937, the RDF development at HMSS changed, with many of their best researchers brought into the activity. John D. S. Rawlinson was made responsible for improving the Type 79X. To increase the efficiency, he decreased the frequency to 43 MHz ( 7 metre wavelength ). Designated Type 79Y, it had separate, stationary transmitting and receiving antennas.

Prototypes of the Type 79Y air-warning system were successfully tested at sea in early 1938. The detection range on aircraft was between 30 and 50 miles (48 and 80 km), depending on height. The systems were then placed into service in August on the cruiser  and in October on the battleship HMS Rodney. These were the first vessels in the Royal Navy with RDF systems.

Germany
A radio-based device for remotely indicating the presence of ships was built in Germany by Christian Hülsmeyer in 1904. Often referred to as the first radar system, this did not directly measure the range (distance) to the target, and thus did not meet the criteria to be given this name.

Over the following three decades in Germany, a number of radio-based detection systems were developed but none were true radars. This situation changed before World War II. Developments in three leading industries are described.

GEMA
In the early 1930s, physicist Rudolf Kühnhold, Scientific Director at the Kriegsmarine (German navy) Nachrichtenmittel-Versuchsanstalt (NVA—Experimental Institute of Communication Systems) in Kiel, was attempting to improve the acoustical methods of underwater detection of ships. He concluded that the desired accuracy in measuring distance to targets could be attained only by using pulsed electromagnetic waves.

During 1933, Kühnhold first attempted to test this concept with a transmitting and receiving set that operated in the microwave region at 13.5 cm (2.22 GHz). The transmitter used a Barkhausen–Kurz tube (the first microwave generator) that produced only 0.1 watt. Unsuccessful with this, he asked for assistance from Paul-Günther Erbslöh and Hans-Karl Freiherr von Willisen, amateur radio operators who were developing a VHF system for communications. They enthusiastically agreed, and in January 1934, formed a company, Gesellschaft für Elektroakustische und Mechanische Apparate (GEMA), for the effort. From the start, the firm was always called simply GEMA.

Work on a Funkmessgerät für Untersuchung (radio measuring device for research) began in earnest at GEMA. Hans Hollmann and Theodor Schultes, both affiliated with the prestigious Heinrich Hertz Institute in Berlin, were added as consultants. The first apparatus used a split-anode magnetron purchased from Philips in the Netherlands. This provided about 70 W at 50 cm (600 MHz), but suffered from frequency instability. Hollmann built a regenerative receiver and Schultes developed Yagi antennas for transmitting and receiving. In October, strong reflections were observed from an aircraft that happened to fly through the beam; this opened consideration of targets other than ships.

Kühnhold then shifted the GEMA work to a pulse-modulated system. A new 50 cm (600 MHz) Philips magnetron with better frequency stability was used. It was modulated with 2- μs pulses at a PRF of 2000 Hz. The transmitting antenna was an array of 10 pairs of dipoles with a reflecting mesh. The wide-band regenerative receiver used Acorn tubes from RCA, and the receiving antenna had three pairs of dipoles and incorporated lobe switching. A blocking device (a duplexer), shut the receiver input when the transmitter pulsed. A Braun tube (a CRT) was used for displaying the range.

The equipment was first tested at a NVA site at the Lübecker Bay near Pelzerhaken. It had limited success, however, in detecting a research ship, Welle, only a short distance away. The receiver was then rebuilt, becoming a super-regenerative set with two intermediate-frequency stages. With this improved receiver, the system readily tracked vessels at up to  range.

In September 1935, a demonstration was given to the Commander-in-Chief of the Kriegsmarine. The system performance was excellent; the range was read off the Braun tube with a tolerance of 50 meters (less than 1 percent variance), and the lobe switching allowed a directional accuracy of 0.1 degree. Historically, this marked the first naval vessel equipped with radar. Although this apparatus was not put into production, GEMA was funded to develop similar systems operating around 50 cm (500 MHz). These became the Seetakt for the Kriegsmarine and the Freya for the Luftwaffe (German Air Force).

Kühnhold remained with the NVA, but also consulted with GEMA. He is considered by many in Germany as the Father of Radar. During 1933–6, Hollmann wrote the first comprehensive treatise on microwaves, Physik und Technik der ultrakurzen Wellen (Physics and Technique of Ultrashort Waves), Springer 1938.

Telefunken
In 1933, when Kühnhold at the NVA was first experimenting with microwaves, he had sought information from Telefunken on microwave tubes. (Telefunken was the largest supplier of radio products in Germany) There, Wilhelm Tolmé Runge had told him that no vacuum tubes were available for these frequencies. In fact, Runge was already experimenting with high-frequency transmitters and had Telefunken's tube department working on cm-wavelength devices.

In the summer of 1935, Runge, now Director of Telefunken's Radio Research Laboratory, initiated an internally funded project in radio-based detection. Using Barkhausen-Kurz tubes, a 50 cm (600 MHz) receiver and 0.5-W transmitter were built. With the antennas placed flat on the ground some distance apart, Runge arranged for an aircraft to fly overhead and found that the receiver gave a strong Doppler-beat interference signal.

Runge, now with Hans Hollmann as a consultant, continued in developing a 1.8 m (170 MHz) system using pulse-modulation. Wilhelm Stepp developed a transmit-receive device (a duplexer) for allowing a common antenna. Stepp also code-named the system Darmstadt after his home town, starting the practice in Telefunken of giving the systems names of cities. The system, with only a few watts transmitter power, was first tested in February 1936, detecting an aircraft at about  distance. This led the Luftwaffe to fund the development of a 50 cm (600 MHz) gun-laying system, the Würzburg.

Lorenz
Since before the First World War, Standard Elektrik Lorenz had been the main supplier of communication equipment for the German military and was the main rival of Telefunken. In late 1935, when Lorenz found that Runge at Telefunken was doing research in radio-based detection equipment, they started a similar activity under Gottfried Müller. A pulse-modulated set called Einheit für Abfragung (DFA – Device for Detection) was built. It used a type DS-310 tube (similar to the Acorn) operating at 70 cm (430 MHz) and about 1 kW power, it had identical transmitting and receiving antennas made with rows of half-wavelength dipoles backed by a reflecting screen.
	
	
The success of this experimental set was reported to the Kriegsmarine, but they showed no interest; they were already fully engaged with GEMA for similar equipment. Also, because of extensive agreements between Lorenz and many foreign countries, the naval authorities had reservations concerning the company handling classified work. The DFA was then demonstrated to the Heer (German Army), and they contracted with Lorenz for developing Kurfürst (Elector), a system for supporting Flugzeugabwehrkanone (Flak, anti-aircraft guns).

United States
In the United States, both the Navy and Army needed means of remotely locating enemy ships and aircraft. In 1930, both services initiated the development of radio equipment that could meet this need. There was little coordination of these efforts; thus, they will be described separately.

United States Navy
In the autumn of 1922, Albert H. Taylor and Leo C. Young at the U.S. Naval Aircraft Radio Laboratory were conducting communication experiments when they noticed that a wooden ship in the Potomac River was interfering with their signals. They prepared a memorandum suggesting that this might be used for ship detection in a harbor defense, but their suggestion was not taken up. In 1930, Lawrence A. Hyland working with Taylor and Young, now at the U.S. Naval Research Laboratory (NRL) in Washington, D.C., used a similar arrangement of radio equipment to detect a passing aircraft. This led to a proposal and patent for using this technique for detecting ships and aircraft.

A simple wave-interference apparatus can detect the presence of an object, but it cannot determine its location or velocity. That had to await the invention of pulsed radar, and later, additional encoding techniques to extract this information from a CW signal. When Taylor's group at the NRL were unsuccessful in getting interference radio accepted as a detection means, Young suggested trying pulsing techniques. This would also allow the direct determination of range to the target. In 1924, Hyland and Young had built such a transmitter for Gregory Breit and Merle A. Tuve at the Carnegie Institution of Washington for successfully measuring the height of the ionosphere.

Robert Morris Page was assigned by Taylor to implement Young's suggestion. Page designed a transmitter operating at 60 MHz and pulsed 10 μs in duration and 90 μs between pulses. In December 1934, the apparatus was used to detect a plane at a distance of one mile (1.6 km) flying up and down the Potomac. Although the detection range was small and the indications on the oscilloscope monitor were almost indistinct, it demonstrated the basic concept of a pulsed radar system. Based on this, Page, Taylor, and Young are usually credited with building and demonstrating the world's first true radar.

An important subsequent development by Page was the duplexer, a device that allowed the transmitter and receiver to use the same antenna without overwhelming or destroying the sensitive receiver circuitry. This also solved the problem associated with synchronization of separate transmitter and receiver antennas which is critical to accurate position determination of long-range targets.

The experiments with pulsed radar were continued, primarily in improving the receiver for handling the short pulses. Their radar was based on low frequency signals, at least by today's standards, and thus required large antennas, making it impractical for ship or aircraft mounting.

Antenna size is inversely proportional to the operating frequency; therefore, the operating frequency of the system was increased to 200 MHz, allowing much smaller antennas. The frequency of 200 MHz was the highest possible with existing transmitter tubes and other components. The new system was successfully tested at the NRL in April 1937, That same month, the first sea-borne testing was conducted. The equipment was temporarily installed on the USS Leary, with a Yagi antenna mounted on a gun barrel for sweeping the field of view.

Based on success of the sea trials, the NRL further improved the system. Page developed the ring oscillator, allowing multiple output tubes and increasing the pulse-power to 15 kW in 5-µs pulses. A 20-by-23 ft (6 x 7 m), stacked-dipole "bedspring" antenna was used. It was installed on the battleship USS New York for sea trials starting in January 1939, and became the first operational radio detection and ranging set in the U.S. fleet.

In May 1939, a contract was awarded to RCA for production. Designated CXAM, deliveries started in May 1940. The acronym RADAR was coined from "Radio Detection And Ranging". One of the first CXAM systems was placed aboard the USS California, a battleship that was sunk in the Japanese attack on Pearl Harbor on December 7, 1941.

United States Army
As the Great Depression started, economic conditions led the U.S. Army Signal Corps to consolidate its widespread laboratory operations to Fort Monmouth, New Jersey. On June 30, 1930, these were designated the Signal Corps Laboratories (SCL) and Lt. Colonel (Dr.) William R. Blair was appointed the SCL Director.

Among other activities, the SCL was made responsible for research in the detection of aircraft by acoustical and infrared radiation means. Blair had performed his doctoral research in the interaction of electromagnet waves with solid materials, and naturally gave attention to this type of detection. Initially, attempts were made to detect infrared radiation, either from the heat of aircraft engines or as reflected from large searchlights with infrared filters, as well as from radio signals generated by the engine ignition.

Some success was made in the infrared detection, but little was accomplished using radio. In 1932, progress at the Naval Research Laboratory (NRL) on radio interference for aircraft detection was passed on to the Army. While it does not appear that any of this information was used by Blair, the SCL did undertake a systematic survey of what was then known throughout the world about the methods of generating, modulating, and detecting radio signals in the microwave region.

The SCL's first definitive efforts in radio-based target detection started in 1934 when the Chief of the Army Signal Corps, after seeing a microwave demonstration by RCA, suggested that radio-echo techniques be investigated. The SCL called this technique radio position-finding (RPF). Based on the previous investigations, the SCL first tried microwaves. During 1934 and 1935, tests of microwave RPF equipment resulted in Doppler-shifted signals being obtained, initially at only a few hundred feet distance and later greater than a mile. These tests involved a bi-static arrangement, with the transmitter at one end of the signal path and the receiver at the other, and the reflecting target passing through or near the path.

Blair was evidently not aware of the success of a pulsed system at the NRL in December 1934. In an internal 1935 note, Blair had commented:

 
In 1936, W. Delmar Hershberger, SCL's Chief Engineer at that time, started a modest project in pulsed microwave transmission. Lacking success with microwaves, Hershberger visited the NRL (where he had earlier worked) and saw a demonstration of their pulsed set. Back at the SCL, he and Robert H. Noyes built an experimental apparatus using a 75 watt, 110 MHz (2.73 m) transmitter with pulse modulation and a receiver patterned on the one at the NRL. A request for project funding was turned down by the War Department, but $75,000 for support was diverted from a previous appropriation for a communication project.

In October 1936, Paul E. Watson became the SCL Chief Engineer and led the project. A field setup near the coast was made with the transmitter and receiver separated by a mile. On December 14, 1936, the experimental set detected at up to  range aircraft flying in and out of New York City.

Work then began on a prototype system. Ralph I. Cole headed receiver work and William S. Marks lead transmitter improvements. Separate receivers and antennas were used for azimuth and elevation detection. Both receiving and the transmitting antennas used large arrays of dipole wires on wooden frames. The system output was intended to aim a searchlight. The first demonstration of the full set was made on the night of May 26, 1937. A bomber was detected and then illuminated by the searchlight. The observers included the Secretary of War, Henry A. Woodring; he was so impressed that the next day orders were given for the full development of the system. Congress gave an appropriation of $250,000.

The frequency was increased to 200 MHz (1.5 m). The transmitter used 16 tubes in a ring oscillator circuit (developed at the NRL), producing about 75 kW peak power. Major James C. Moore was assigned to head the complex electrical and mechanical design of lobe switching antennas. Engineers from Western Electric and Westinghouse were brought in to assist in the overall development. Designated SCR-268, a prototype was successfully demonstrated in late 1938 at Fort Monroe, Virginia. The production of SCR-268 sets was started by Western Electric in 1939, and it entered service in early 1941.

Even before the SCR-268 entered service, it had been greatly improved. In a project led by Major (Dr.) Harold A. Zahl, two new configurations evolved – the SCR-270 (mobile) and the SCR-271 (fixed-site). Operation at 106 MHz (2.83 m) was selected, and a single water-cooled tube provided 8 kW (100 kW pulsed) output power. Westinghouse received a production contract, and started deliveries near the end of 1940.

The Army deployed five of the first SCR-270 sets around the island of Oahu in Hawaii. At 7:02 on the morning of December 7, 1941, one of these radars detected a flight of aircraft at a range of  due north. The observation was passed on to an aircraft warning center where it was misidentified as a flight of U.S. bombers known to be approaching from the mainland. The alarm went unheeded, and at 7:48, the Japanese aircraft first struck at Pearl Harbor.

USSR
In 1895, Alexander Stepanovich Popov, a physics instructor at the Imperial Russian Navy school in Kronstadt, developed an apparatus using a coherer tube for detecting distant lightning strikes. The next year, he added a spark-gap transmitter and demonstrated the first radio communication set in Russia. During 1897, while testing this in communicating between two ships in the Baltic Sea, he took note of an interference beat caused by the passage of a third vessel. In his report, Popov wrote that this phenomenon might be used for detecting objects, but he did nothing more with this observation.

In a few years following the 1917 Russian Revolution and the establishment the Union of Soviet Socialist Republics (USSR or Soviet Union) in 1924, Germany's Luftwaffe had aircraft capable of penetrating deep into Soviet territory. Thus, the detection of aircraft at night or above clouds was of great interest to the Soviet Air Defense Forces (PVO).

The PVO depended on optical devices for locating targets, and had physicist Pavel K. Oshchepkov conducting research in possible improvement of these devices. In June 1933, Oshchepkov changed his research from optics to radio techniques and started the development of a razvedyvlatl’naya elektromagnitnaya stantsiya (reconnaissance electromagnetic station). In a short time, Oshchepkov was made responsible for a technical expertise sector of PVO devoted to radiolokatory (radio-location) techniques as well as heading a Special Design Bureau (SKB, spetsialnoe konstruktorskoe byuro) in Leningrad.

Radio-location beginnings
The Glavnoe Artilleriyskoe Upravlenie (GAU, Main Artillery Administration) was considered the "brains" of the Red Army. It not only had competent engineers and physicists on its central staff, but also had a number of scientific research institutes. Thus, the GAU was also assigned the aircraft detection problem, and Lt. Gen. M. M. Lobanov was placed in charge.

After examining existing optical and acoustical equipment, Lobanov also turned to radio-location techniques. For this he approached the Tsentral’naya Radiolaboratoriya (TsRL, Central Radio Laboratory) in Leningrad. Here, Yu. K. Korovin was conducting research on VHF communications, and had built a 50 cm (600 MHz), 0.2 W transmitter using a Barkhausen–Kurz tube. For testing the concept, Korovin arranged the transmitting and receiving antennas along the flight path of an aircraft. On January 3, 1934, a Doppler signal was received by reflections from the aircraft at some 600 m range and 100–150 m altitude.

For further research in detection methods, a major conference on this subject was arranged for the PVO by the Russian Academy of Sciences (RAN). The conference was held in Leningrad in mid-January 1934, and chaired by Abram Fedorovich Ioffe, Director of the Leningrad Physical-Technical Institute (LPTI). Ioffe was generally considered the top Russian physicist of his time. All types of detection techniques were discussed, but radio-location received the greatest attention.

To distribute the conference findings to a wider audience, the proceedings were published the following month in a journal. This included all of the then-existing information on radio-location in the USSR, available (in Russian language) to researchers in this field throughout the world.

Recognizing the potential value of radio-location to the military, the GAU made a separate agreement with the Leningrad Electro-Physics Institute (LEPI), for a radio-location system. This technical effort was led by B. K. Shembel. The LEPI had built a transmitter and receiver to study the radio-reflection characteristics of various materials and targets. Shembel readily made this into an experimental bi-static radio-location system called Bistro (Rapid).
 
The Bistro transmitter, operating at 4.7 m (64 MHz), produced near 200 W and was frequency-modulated by a 1 kHz tone. A fixed transmitting antenna gave a broad coverage of what was called a radioekran (radio screen). A regenerative receiver, located some distance from the transmitter, had a dipole antenna mounted on a hand-driven reciprocating mechanism. An aircraft passing into the screened zone would reflect the radiation, and the receiver would detect the Doppler-interference beat between the transmitted and reflected signals.
	
Bistro was first tested during the summer of 1934. With the receiver up to 11 km away from the transmitter, the set could only detect an aircraft entering a screen at about  range and under 1,000 m. With improvements, it was believed to have a potential range of 75 km, and five sets were ordered in October for field trials. Bistro is often cited as the USSR's first radar system; however, it was incapable of directly measuring range and thus could not be so classified.

LEPI and TsRL were both made a part of Nauchno-issledovatelsky institut-9 (NII-9, Scientific Research Institute #9), a new GAU organization opened in Leningrad in 1935. Mikhail A. Bonch-Bruyevich, a renowned radio physicist previously with TsRL and the University of Leningrad, was named the NII-9 Scientific Director.

Research on magnetrons began at Kharkov University in Ukraine during the mid-1920s. Before the end of the decade this had resulted in publications with worldwide distribution, such as the German journal Annalen der Physik (Annals of Physics). Based on this work, Ioffe recommended that a portion of the LEPI be transferred to the city of Kharkiv, resulting in the Ukrainian Institute of Physics and Technology (LIPT) being formed in 1930. Within the LIPT, the Laboratory of Electromagnetic Oscillations (LEMO), headed by Abram A. Slutskin, continued with magnetron development. Led by Aleksandr S. Usikov, a number of advanced segmented-anode magnetrons evolved. (It is noted that these and other early magnetrons developed in the USSR suffered from frequency instability, a problem in their use in Soviet radar systems.)

In 1936, one of Usikov's magnetrons producing about 7 W at 18 cm (1.7 GHz) was used by Shembel at the NII-9 as a transmitter in a radioiskatel (radio-seeker) called Burya (Storm). Operating similarly to Bistro, the range of detection was about 10 km, and provided azimuth and elevation coordinates estimated to within 4 degrees. No attempts were made to make this into a pulsed system, thus, it could not provide range and was not qualified to be classified as a radar. It was, however, the first microwave radio-detection system.

While work by Shembel and Bonch-Bruyevich on continuous-wave systems was taking place at NII-9, Oshehepkov at the SKB and V. V. Tsimbalin of Ioffe's LPTI were pursuing a pulsed system. In 1936, they built a radio-location set operating at 4 m (75 MHz) with a peak-power of about 500 W and a 10-μs pulse duration. Before the end of the year, tests using separated transmitting and receiving sites resulted in an aircraft being detected at 7 km. In April 1937, with the peak-pulse power increased to 1 kW and the antenna separation also increased, test showed a detection range of near 17 km at a height of 1.5 km. Although a pulsed system, it was not capable of directly providing range – the technique of using pulses for determining range had not yet been developed.

Pre-war radio location systems
In June 1937, all of the work in Leningrad on radio-location suddenly stopped. The infamous Great Purge of dictator Joseph Stalin swept over the military high commands and its supporting scientific community. The PVO chief was executed. Oshchepkov, charged with "high crime", was sentenced to 10 years at a Gulag penal labor camp. NII-9 as an organization was saved, but Shenbel was dismissed and Bonch-Bruyevich was named the new director.

The Nauchnoissledovatel'skii ispytalel'nyi institut svyazi RKKA (NIIIS-KA, Scientific Research Institute of Signals of the Red Army), had initially opposed research in radio-location, favoring instead acoustical techniques. However, this portion of the Red Army gained power as a result of the Great Purge, and did an about face, pressing hard for speedy development of radio-location systems. They took over Oshchepkov's laboratory and were made responsible for all existing and future agreements for research and factory production. Writing later about the Purge and subsequent effects, General Lobanov commented that it led to the development being placed under a single organization, and the rapid reorganization of the work.

At Oshchepkov's former laboratory, work with the 4 m (75 MHz) pulsed-transmission system was continued by A. I. Shestako. Through pulsing, the transmitter produced a peak power of 1 kW, the highest level thus far generated. In July 1938, a fixed-position, bi-static experimental system detected an aircraft at about 30 km range at heights of 500 m, and at 95 km range, for high-flying targets at 7.5 km altitude. The system was still incapable of directly determining the range. The project was then taken up by Ioffe's LPTI, resulting in the development of a mobile system designated Redut (Redoubt). An arrangement of new transmitter tubes was used, giving near 50 kW peak-power with a 10 μs pulse-duration. Yagi antennas were adopted for both transmitting and receiving.

The Redut was first field tested in October 1939, at a site near Sevastopol, a port in Ukraine on the coast of the Black Sea. This testing was in part to show the NKKF (Soviet Navy) the value of early-warning radio-location for protecting strategic ports. With the equipment on a cliff about 160 meters above sea level, a flying boat was detected at ranges up to 150 km. The Yagi antennas were spaced about 1,000 meters; thus, close coordination was required to aim them in synchronization. An improved version of the Redut, the Redut-K, was developed by Aksel Berg in 1940 and placed aboard the light cruiser Molotov in April 1941. Molotov became the first Soviet warship equipped with radar.

At the NII-9 under Bonch-Bruyevich, scientists developed two types of very advanced microwave generators. In 1938, a linear-beam, velocity-modulated vacuum tube (a klystron) was developed by Nikolay Devyatkov, based on designs from Kharkiv. This device produced about 25 W at 15–18 cm (2.0–1.7 GHz) and was later used in experimental systems. Devyatkov followed this with a simpler, single-resonator device (a reflex klystron). At this same time, D. E. Malyarov and N. F. Alekseyev were building a series of magnetrons, also based on designs from Kharkov; the best of these produced 300 W at 9 cm (3 GHz).
 
Also at NII-9, D. S. Stogov was placed in charge of the improvements to the Bistro system. Redesignated as Reven (Rhubarb), it was tested in August 1938, but was only marginally better than the predecessor. With additional minor operational improvements, it was made into a mobile system called Radio Ulavlivatel Samoletov (RUS, Radio Catcher of Aircraft), soon designated as RUS-1. This continuous-wave, bi-static system had a truck-mounted transmitter operating at 4.7 m (64 MHz) and two truck-mounted receivers.

Although the RUS-1 transmitter was in a cabin on the rear of a truck, the antenna had to be strung between external poles anchored to the ground. A second truck carrying the electrical generator and other equipment was backed against the transmitter truck. Two receivers were used, each in a truck-mounted cabin with a dipole antenna on a rotatable pole extended overhead. In use, the receiver trucks were placed about 40 km apart; thus, with two positions, it would be possible to make a rough estimate of the range by triangulation on a map.

The RUS-1 system was tested and put into production in 1939, then entered service in 1940, becoming the first deployed radio-location system in the Red Army. About 45 RUS-1 systems were built at the Svetlana Factory in Leningrad before the end of 1941, and deployed along the western USSR borders and in the Far East. Without direct ranging capability, however, the military found the RUS-1 to be of little value.

Even before the demise of efforts in Leningrad, the NIIIS-KA had contracted with the UIPT in Kharkov to investigate a pulsed radio-location system for anti-aircraft applications. This led the LEMO, in March 1937, to start an internally funded project with the code name Zenit (a popular football team at the time). The transmitter development was led by Usikov, supplier of the magnetron used earlier in the Burya. For the Zenit, Usikov used a 60 cm (500 MHz) magnetron pulsed at 10–20 μs duration and providing 3 kW pulsed power, later increased to near 10 kW. Semion Braude led the development of a superheterodyne receiver using a tunable magnetron as the local oscillator. The system had separate transmitting and receiving antennas set about 65 m apart, built with dipoles backed by 3-meter parabolic reflectors. 
	
Zenit was first tested in October 1938. In this, a medium-sized bomber was detected at a range of 3 km. The testing was observed by the NIIIS-KA and found to be sufficient for starting a contracted effort. An agreement was made in May 1939, specifying the required performance and calling for the system to be ready for production by 1941. The transmitter was increased in power, the antennas had selsens added to allow them to track, and the receiver sensitivity was improved by using an RCA 955 acorn triode as the local oscillator.

A demonstration of the improved Zenit was given in September 1940. In this, it was shown that the range, altitude, and azimuth of an aircraft flying at heights between 4,000 and 7,000 meters could be determined at up to 25 km distance. The time required for these measurements, however, was about 38 seconds, far too long for use by anti-aircraft batteries. Also, with the antennas aimed at a low angle, there was a dead zone of some distance caused by interference from ground-level reflections. While this performance was not satisfactory for immediate gun-laying applications, it was the first full three-coordinate radio-location system in the Soviet Union and showed the way for future systems.

Work at the LEMO continued on Zenit, particularly in converting it into a single-antenna system designated Rubin. This effort, however, was disrupted by the invasion of the USSR by Germany in June 1941. In a short while, the development activities at Kharkov were ordered to be evacuated to the Far East. The research efforts in Leningrad were similarly dispersed.

After eight years of effort by highly qualified physicists and engineers, the USSR entered World War II without a fully developed and fielded radar system.

Japan
As a seafaring nation, Japan had an early interest in wireless (radio) communications. The first known use of wireless telegraphy in warfare at sea was by the Imperial Japanese Navy, in defeating the Russian Imperial Fleet in 1904 at the Battle of Port Arthur. There was an early interest in equipment for radio direction-finding, for use in both navigation and military surveillance. The Imperial Navy developed an excellent receiver for this purpose in 1921, and soon most of the Japanese warships had this equipment.

In the two decades between the two World Wars, radio technology in Japan made advancements on a par with that in the western nations. There were often impediments, however, in transferring these advancements into the military. For a long time, the Japanese had believed that they had the best fighting capability of any military force in the world. The military leaders, who were then also in control of the government, sincerely felt that the weapons, aircraft, and ships that they had built were fully sufficient and, with these as they were, the Japanese Army and Navy were invincible. In 1936, Japan joined Nazi Germany and Fascist Italy in a Tripartite Pact.

Technology background
Radio engineering was strong in Japan's higher education institutions, especially the Imperial (government-financed) universities. This included undergraduate and graduate study, as well as academic research in this field. Special relationships were established with foreign universities and institutes, particularly in Germany, with Japanese teachers and researchers often going overseas for advanced study.

The academic research tended toward the improvement of basic technologies, rather than their specific applications. There was considerable research in high-frequency and high-power oscillators, such as the magnetron, but the application of these devices was generally left to industrial and military researchers.

One of Japan's best-known radio researchers in the 1920s–1930s era was Professor Hidetsugu Yagi. After graduate study in Germany, England, and America, Yagi joined Tohoku University, where his research centered on antennas and oscillators for high-frequency communications. A summary of the radio research work at Tohoku University was contained in a 1928 seminal paper by Yagi.

Jointly with Shintaro Uda, one of Yagi's first doctoral students, a radically new antenna emerged. It had a number of parasitic elements (directors and reflectors) and would come to be known as the Yagi-Uda or Yagi antenna. A U.S. patent, issued in May 1932, was assigned to RCA. To this day, this is the most widely used directional antenna worldwide.

The cavity magnetron was also of interest to Yagi. This HF (~10-MHz) device had been invented in 1921 by Albert W. Hull at General Electric, and Yagi was convinced that it could function in the VHF or even the UHF region. In 1927, Kinjiro Okabe, another of Yagi's early doctoral students, developed a split-anode device that ultimately generated oscillations at wavelengths down to about 12 cm (2.5 GHz).

Researchers at other Japanese universities and institutions also started projects in magnetron development, leading to improvements in the split-anode device. These included Kiyoshi Morita at the Tokyo Institute of Technology, and Tsuneo Ito at Tokoku University.

Shigeru Nakajima at Japan Radio Company (JRC) saw a commercial potential of these devices and began the further development and subsequent very profitable production of magnetrons for the medical dielectric heating (diathermy) market. The only military interest in magnetrons was shown by Yoji Ito at the Naval Technical Research Institute (NTRI).

The NTRI was formed in 1922, and became fully operational in 1930. Located at Meguro, Tokyo, near the Tokyo Institute of Technology, first-rate scientists, engineers, and technicians were engaged in activities ranging from designing giant submarines to building new radio tubes. Included were all of the precursors of radar, but this did not mean that the heads of the Imperial Navy accepted these accomplishments.

In 1936, Tsuneo Ito (no relationship to Yoji Ito) developed an 8-split-anode magnetron that produced about 10 W at 10 cm (3 GHz). Based on its appearance, it was named Tachibana (or Mandarin, an orange citrus fruit). Tsuneo Ito also joined the NTRI and continued his research on magnetrons in association with Yoji Ito. In 1937, they developed the technique of coupling adjacent segments (called push-pull), resulting in frequency stability, an extremely important magnetron breakthrough.

By early 1939, NTRI/JRC had jointly developed a 10-cm (3-GHz), stable-frequency Mandarin-type magnetron (No. M3) that, with water cooling, could produce 500-W power. In the same time period, magnetrons were built with 10 and 12 cavities operating as low as 0.7 cm (40 GHz). The configuration of the M3 magnetron was essentially the same as that used later in the magnetron developed by Boot and Randall at Birmingham University in early 1940, including the improvement of strapped cavities. Unlike the high-power magnetron in Britain, however, the initial device from the NTRI generated only a few hundred watts.

In general, there was no lack of scientific and engineering capabilities in Japan; their warships and aircraft clearly showed high levels of technical competency. They were ahead of Britain in the development of magnetrons, and their Yagi antenna was the world standard for VHF systems. It was simply that the top military leaders failed to recognize how the application of radio in detection and ranging – what was often called the Radio Range Finder (RRF) – could be of value, particularly in any defensive role; offense not defense, totally dominated their thinking.

Imperial Army
In 1938, engineers from the Research Office of Nippon Electric Company (NEC) were making coverage tests on high-frequency transmitters when rapid fading of the signal was observed. This occurred whenever an aircraft passed over the line between the transmitter and receiving meter. Masatsugu Kobayashi, the Manager of NEC's Tube Department, recognized that this was due to the beat-frequency interference of the direct signal and the Doppler-shifted signal reflected from the aircraft.

Kobayashi suggested to the Army Science Research Institute that this phenomenon might be used as an aircraft warning method. Although the Army had rejected earlier proposals for using radio-detection techniques, this one had appeal because it was based on an easily understandable method and would require little developmental cost and risk to prove its military value. NEC assigned Kinji Satake of their Research Institute to develop a system called the Bi-static Doppler Interference Detector (BDID).
 
For testing the prototype system, it was set up on an area recently occupied by Japan along the coast of China. The BDID was the Imperial Army's first deployed radio-based detection system, placed into operation in early 1941.

A similar system was developed by Satake for the Japanese homeland. Information centers received oral warnings from the operators at BDID stations, usually spaced between 65 and 240 km (40 and 150 mi). To reduce homing vulnerability – a great fear of the military – the transmitters operated with only a few watts power. Although originally intended to be temporary until better systems were available, they remained in operation throughout the war. It was not until after the start of war that the Imperial Army had equipment that could be called radar.

Imperial Navy
In the mid-1930s, some of the technical specialists in the Imperial Navy became interested in the possibility of using radio to detect aircraft. For consultation, they turned to Professor Yagi who was the Director of the Radio Research Laboratory at Osaka Imperial University. Yagi suggested that this might be done by examining the Doppler frequency-shift in a reflected signal.
 
Funding was provided to the Osaka Laboratory for experimental investigation of this technique. Kinjiro Okabe, the inventor of the split-anode magnetron and who had followed Yagi to Osaka, led the effort. Theoretical analyses indicated that the reflections would be greater if the wavelength was approximately the same as the size of aircraft structures. Thus, a VHF transmitter and receiver with Yagi antennas separated some distance were used for the experiment.
 
In 1936, Okabe successfully detected a passing aircraft by the Doppler-interference method; this was the first recorded demonstration in Japan of aircraft detection by radio. With this success, Okabe's research interest switched from magnetrons to VHF equipment for target detection. This, however, did not lead to any significant funding. The top levels of the Imperial Navy believed that any advantage of using radio for this purpose were greatly outweighed by enemy intercept and disclosure of the sender's presence.

Historically, warships in formation used lights and horns to avoid collision at night or when in fog. Newer techniques of VHF radio communications and direction-finding might also be used, but all of these methods were highly vulnerable to enemy interception. At the NTRI, Yoji Ito proposed that the UHF signal from a magnetron might be used to generate a very narrow beam that would have a greatly reduced chance of enemy detection.
	
Development of microwave system for collision avoidance started in 1939, when funding was provided by the Imperial Navy to JRC for preliminary experiments. In a cooperative effort involving Yoji Ito of the NTRI and Shigeru Nakajima of JRC, an apparatus using a 3-cm (10-GHz) magnetron with frequency modulation was designed and built. The equipment was used in an attempt to detect reflections from tall structures a few kilometers away. This experiment gave poor results, attributed to the very low power from the magnetron.

The initial magnetron was replaced by one operating at 16 cm (1.9 GHz) and with considerably higher power. There was still no commitment by top Japanese naval officials for using this technology aboard warships. Nothing more was done at this time, but late in 1941, the system was adopted for limited use.

In late 1940, Japan arranged for two technical missions to visit Germany and exchange information about their developments in military technology. Commander Yoji Ito represented the Navy's interest in radio applications, and Lieutenant Colonel Kinji Satake did the same for the Army. During a visit of several months, they exchanged significant general information, as well as limited secret materials in some technologies, but little directly concerning radio-detection techniques. Neither side even mentioned magnetrons, but the Germans did apparently disclose their use of pulsed techniques.

After receiving the reports from the technical exchange in Germany, as well as intelligence reports concerning the success of Britain with firing using RDF, the Naval General Staff reversed itself and tentatively accepted pulse-transmission technology. On August 2, 1941, even before Yoji Ito returned to Japan, funds were allocated for the initial development of pulse-modulated radars. Commander Chuji Hashimoto of the NTRI was responsible for initiating this activity.

A prototype set operating at 4.2 m (71 MHz) and producing about 5 kW was completed on a crash basis. With the NTRI in the lead, the firm NEC and the Research Laboratory of Japan Broadcasting Corporation (NHK) made major contributions to the effort. Kenjiro Takayanagi, Chief Engineer of NHK's experimental television station and called "the father of Japanese television", was especially helpful in rapidly developing the pulse-forming and timing circuits, as well as the receiver display.
	
The system, Japan's first full Radio Range Finder (RRF – radar), was designated Mark 1 Model 1. Contracts were given to three firms for serial production; NEC built the transmitters and pulse modulators, Japan Victor the receivers and associated displays, and Fuji Electrical the antennas and their servo drives. The system operated at 3.0 m (100 MHz) with a peak-power of 40 kW. Dipole arrays with matte+-type reflectors were used in separate antennas for transmitting and receiving.

A large system, it weighed close to 8,700 kg (19,000 lb).

Netherlands
Early radio-based detection in the Netherlands was along two independent lines: one a microwave system at the firm Philips and the other a VHF system at a laboratory of the Armed Forces.
 
The Philips Company in Eindhoven, Netherlands, operated Natuurkundig Laboratorium (NatLab) for fundamental research related to its products. NatLab researcher Klaas Posthumus developed a magnetron split into four elements. 
In developing a communication system using this magnetron, C.H.J.A. Staal was testing the transmission by using parabolic transmitting and receiving antennas set side-by-side, both aimed at a large plate some distance away. To overcome frequency instability of the magnetron, pulse modulation was used. It was found that the plate reflected a strong signal.

Recognizing the potential importance of this as a detection device, NatLab arranged a demonstration for the Koninklijke Marine (Royal Netherlands Navy). This was conducted in 1937 across the entrance to the main naval port at Marsdiep. Reflections from sea waves obscured the return from the target ship, but the Navy was sufficiently impressed to initiate sponsorship of the research.

A prototype system was built by Philips, and plans were started by the firm Nederlandse Seintoestellen Fabriek (a Philips subsidiary) for building a chain of warning stations to protect the primary ports. Some field testing of the prototype was conducted, but the project was discontinued when Germany invaded the Netherlands on May 10, 1940. Within the NatLab, however, the work was continued in great secrecy until 1942.

During the early 1930s, there were widespread rumours of a "death ray" being developed. The Dutch Parliament set up a Committee for the Applications of Physics in Weaponry under G.J. Elias to examine this potential, but the Committee quickly discounted death rays. The Committee did, however, establish the Laboratorium voor Fysieke Ontwikkeling (LFO, Laboratory for Physical Development), dedicated to supporting the Netherlands Armed Forces.

Operating in great secrecy, the LFO opened a facility called the Meetgebouw (Measurements Building) located on the Plain of Waalsdorp. In 1934, J.L.W.C. von Weiler joined the LFO and, with S.G. Gratama, began research on a 1.25-m (240-MHz) communication system to be used in artillery spotting.

In 1937, while tests were being conducted on this system, a passing flock of birds disturbed the signal. Realizing that this might be a potential method for detecting aircraft, the Minister of War ordered continuation of the experiments. Weiler and Gratama set about developing a system for directing searchlights and aiming anti-aircraft guns.

The experimental "electrical listening device" operated at 70 cm (430 MHz) and used pulsed transmission at an RPF of 10 kHz. A transmit-receive blocking circuit was developed to allow a common antenna. The received signal was displayed on a CR tube with a circular time base. The set was rejected, however, because it could not withstand the harsh environment of Army combat conditions.

The Navy was more receptive. Funding was provided for final development, and Max Staal was added to the team. To maintain secrecy, they divided the development into parts. The transmitter was built at the Delft Technical College and the receiver at the University of Leiden. Ten sets would be assembled under the personal supervision of J.J.A. Schagen van Leeuwen, head of the firm Hazemeijer Fabriek van Signaalapparaten.

The prototype had a peak-power of 1 kW, and used a pulse length of 2 to 3 μs with a 10- to 20 kHz PRF. The receiver was a super-heterodyne type using Acorn tubes and a 6 MHz IF stage. The antenna consisted of 4 rows of 16 half-wave dipoles backed by a 3- by 3-meter mesh screen. The operator used a bicycle-type drive to rotate the antenna, and the elevation could be changed using a hand crank.

Several sets were completed, and one was put into operation on the Malieveld in The Hague just before the Netherlands fell to Germany in May 1940. The set worked well, spotting enemy aircraft during the first days of fighting. To prevent capture, operating units and plans for the system were destroyed. Von Weiler and Max Staal fled to England aboard one of the last ships able to leave, carrying two disassembled sets with them. Later, Gratama and van Leeuwen also escaped to England.

France
In 1927, French physicists Camille Gutton and Emile Pierret experimented with magnetrons and other devices generating wavelengths going down to 16 cm. Camille's son, Henri Gutton, was with the Compagnie générale de la télégraphie sans fil (CSF) where he and Robert Warneck improved his father's magnetrons.

In 1934, following systematic studies on the magnetron, the research branch of the CSF, headed by Maurice Ponte, submitted a patent application for a device designed to detect obstacles using continuous radiation of ultra-short wavelengths produced by a magnetron. These were still CW systems and depended on Doppler interference for detection. However, as most modern radars, antennas were collocated. The device was measuring distance and azimuth but not directly as in the later "radar" on a screen (1939). Still, this was the first patent of an operational radio-detection apparatus using centimetric wavelengths.

The system was tested in late 1934 aboard the cargo ship Oregon, with two transmitters working at 80 cm and 16 cm wavelengths. Coastlines and boats were detected from a range of 10–12 nautical miles. The shortest wavelength was chosen for the final design, which equipped the liner  as early as mid-1935 for operational use.

In late 1937, Maurice Elie at SFR developed a means of pulse-modulating transmitter tubes. This led to a new 16-cm system with a peak power near 500 W and a pulse width of 6 μs. French and U.S. patents were filed in December 1939. The system was planned to be sea-tested aboard the Normandie, but this was cancelled at the outbreak of war.

At the same time, Pierre David at the Laboratoire National de Radioélectricité (National Laboratory of Radioelectricity, LNR) experimented with reflected radio signals at about a meter wavelength. Starting in 1931, he observed that aircraft caused interference to the signals. The LNR then initiated research on a detection technique called barrage électromagnétique (electromagnetic curtain). While this could indicate the general location of penetration, precise determination of direction and speed was not possible.

In 1936, the Défense Aérienne du Territoire (Defence of Air Territory), ran tests on David's electromagnetic curtain. In the tests, the system detected most of the entering aircraft, but too many were missed. As the war grew closer, the need for an aircraft detection was critical. David realized the advantages of a pulsed system, and in October 1938 he designed a 50 MHz, pulse-modulated system with a peak-pulse power of 12 kW. This was built by the firm SADIR.

France declared war on Germany on September 1, 1939, and there was a great need for an early-warning detection system. However, the German advance was overwhelming and emergency measures had to be taken; it was too late for France to develop radars alone and it was decided that her breakthroughs would be shared with her allies.

In mid-1940, Maurice Ponte, from the laboratories of CSF in Paris, presented a cavity magnetron designed by Henri Gutton at SFR (see above) to the GEC laboratories at Wembley, Britain. This magnetron was designed for pulsed operation at a wavelength of 16 cm. Unlike other magnetron designs to that day, such as the Boots and Randall magnetron (see British contributions above), this tube used an oxide-coated cathode with a peak power output of 1 kW, demonstrating that oxide cathodes were the solution for producing high-power pulses at short wavelengths, a problem which had eluded British and American researchers for years. The significance this event was underlined by Eric Megaw, in a 1946 review of early radar developments: "This was the starting point of the use of the oxide cathode in practically all our subsequent pulsed transmitting waves and as such was a significant contribution to British radar. The date was the 8th May 1940". A tweaked version of this magnetron reached a peak output of 10 kW by August 1940. It was that model which, in turn, was handed to the Americans as a token of good faith during the negotiations made by the Tizard delegation in 1940 to obtain from the U.S. the resources necessary for Britain to exploit the full military potential of her research and development work.

Italy
Guglielmo Marconi initiated the research in Italy on radio-based detection technology. In 1933, while participating with his Italian firm in experiments with a 600 MHz communications link across Rome, he noted transmission disturbances caused by moving objects adjacent to its path. This led to the development at his laboratory at Cornegliano of a 330-MHz (0.91-m) CW Doppler detection system that he called radioecometro. Barkhausen–Kurz tubes were used in both the transmitter and receiver.

In May 1935, Marconi demonstrated his system to the Fascist dictator Benito Mussolini and members of the military General Staff; however the output power was insufficient for military use. While Marconi's demonstration raised considerable interest, little more was done with his apparatus.

Mussolini directed that radio-based detection technology be further developed, and it was assigned to the Regio Istituto Elettrotecnico e delle Comunicazioni (RIEC, Royal Institute for Electro-technics and Communications). The RIEC had been established in 1916 on the campus of the Italian Naval Academy in Livorno. Lieutenant Ugo Tiberio, a physics and radio-technology instructor at the Academy, was assigned to head the project on a part-time basis.

Tiberio prepared a report on developing an experimental apparatus that he called telemetro radiofonico del rivelatore (RDT, Radio-Detector Telemetry). The report, submitted in mid-1936, included what was later known as the radar range equation. When the work got underway, Nello Carrara, a civilian physics instructor who had been doing research at the RIEC in microwaves, was added to be responsible for developing the RDT transmitter.

Before the end of 1936, Tiberio and Carrara had demonstrated the EC-1, the first Italian RDT system. This had an FM transmitter operating at 200 MHz (1.5 m) with a single parabolic cylinder antenna. It detected by mixing the transmitted and the Doppler-shifted reflected signals, resulting in an audible tone.

The EC-1 did not provide a range measurement; to add this capability, development of a pulsed system was initiated in 1937. Captain Alfeo Brandimarte joined the group and primarily designed the first pulsed system, the EC-2. This operated at 175 MHz (1.7 m) and used a single antenna made with a number of equi-phased dipoles. The detected signal was intended to be displayed on an oscilloscope. There were many problems, and the system never reached the testing stage.
	
Work then turned to developing higher power and operating frequencies. Carrara, in cooperation with the firm FIVRE, developed a magnetron-like device. This was composed of a pair of triodes connected to a resonate cavity and produced 10 kW at 425 MHz (70 cm). It was used in designing two versions of the EC-3, one for shipboard and the other for coastal defense.

Italy, joining Germany, entered WWII in June 1940 without an operational RDT. A breadboard of the EC-3 was built and tested from atop a building at the Academy, but most RDT work was stopped as direct support of the war took priority.

Others
In early 1939, the British Government invited representatives from the most technically advanced Commonwealth Nations to visit England for briefings and demonstrations on the highly secret RDF (radar) technology. Based on this, RDF developments were started in Australia, Canada, New Zealand, and South Africa by September 1939. In addition, this technology was independently developed in Hungary early in the war period.

Australia: the Radiophysics Laboratory in Australia was established at Sydney University under the Council for Scientific and Industrial Research; John H. Piddington was responsible for RDF development. The first project was a 200-MHz (1.5-m) shore-defense system for the Australian Army. Designated ShD, this was first tested in September 1941, and eventually installed at 17 ports. Following the Japanese attack on Pearl Harbor, the Royal Australian Air Force urgently needed an air-warning system, and Piddington's team, using the ShD as a basis, put the AW Mark I together in five days. It was being installed in Darwin, Northern Territory, when Australia received the first Japanese attack on February 19, 1942. A short time later, it was converted to a light-weight transportable version, the LW-AW Mark II; this was used by the Australian forces, as well as the U.S. Army, in early island landings in the South Pacific.

Canada: The early RDF developments in Canada were at the Radio Section of the National Research Council of Canada. Using commercial components and with essentially no further assistance from Britain, John Tasker Henderson led a team in developing the Night Watchman, a surface-warning system for the Royal Canadian Navy to protect the entrance to the Halifax Harbour. Successfully tested in July 1940, this set operated at 200 MHz (1.5 m), had a 1 kW output with a pulse length of 0.5 μs, and used a relatively small, fixed antenna. This was followed by a ship-borne set designated Surface Warning 1st Canadian (SW1C) with the antenna hand-rotated through the use of a Chevrolet steering wheel in the operator's compartment. The SW1C was first tested at sea in mid-May 1941, but the performance was so poor compared to the Royal Navy's Model 271 ship-borne radar that the Royal Canadian Navy eventually adopted the British 271 in place of the SW1C.

For coastal defense by the Canadian Army, a 200 MHz set with a transmitter similar to the Night Watchman was developed. Designated CD, it used a large, rotating antenna atop a  wooden tower. The CD was put into operation in January 1942.

New Zealand: Ernest Marsden represented New Zealand at the briefings in England, and then established two facilities for RDF development – one in Wellington at the Radio Section of the Central NZ Post Office, and another at Canterbury University College in Christchurch. Charles N. Watson-Munro led the development of land-based and airborne sets at Wellington, while Frederick W. G. White led the development of shipboard sets at Christchurch.

Before the end of 1939, the Wellington group had converted an existing 180-MHz (1.6-m), 1 kW transmitter to produce 2-μs pulses and tested it to detect large vessels at up to 30 km; this was designated CW (Coastal Watching). A similar set, designated CD (Coast Defense) used a CRT for display and had lobe-switching on the receiving antenna; this was deployed in Wellington in late 1940. A partially completed ASV 200 MHz set was brought from Britain by Marsden, and another group at Wellington built this into an aircraft set for the Royal New Zealand Air Force; this was first flown in early 1940. At Christchurch, there was a smaller staff and work went slower, but by July 1940, a 430-MHz (70-cm), 5 kW set was tested. Two types, designated SW (Ship Warning) and SWG (Ship Warning, Gunnery), were placed into service by the Royal New Zealand Navy starting in August 1941. In all some 44 types were developed in New Zealand during WWII. 

Radar systems were developed from 1939; initially New Zealand made but then (because of difficulty on sourcing components) British made. Transportable GCI radar sets  were deployed in the Pacific, including one with RNZAF personnel at the American aerodrome at Henderson Field, Guadalcanal in September 1942, where the American SCR 270-B sets could not plot heights so were inadequate against frequent Japanese night raids. In the first half of 1943 additional New Zealand radar units and staff were sent to the Pacific at the request of COMOSPAC, Admiral Halsey.

South Africa did not have a representative at the 1939 meetings in England, but in mid-September, as Ernest Marsden was returning by ship to New Zealand, Basil F. J. Schonland came aboard and received three days of briefings. Schonland, a world authority on lightning and Director of the Bernard Price Institute of Geophysics at Witwatersrand University, immediately started an RDF development using amateur radio components and Institute's lightning-monitoring equipment. Designated JB (for Johannesburg), the 90-MHz (3.3-m), 500-W mobile system was tested in November 1939, just two months after its start. The prototype was operated in Durban before the end of 1939, detecting ships and aircraft at distances up to 80 km, and by the next March a system was fielded by anti-aircraft brigades of the South African Defence Force.

Hungary: Zoltán Lajos Bay in Hungary was a Professor of Physics at the Technical University of Budapest as well as the Research Director of Egyesült Izzolampa (IZZO), a radio and electrical manufacturing firm. In late 1942, IZZO was directed by the Minister of Defense to develop a radio-location (rádiólokáció, radar) system. Using journal papers on ionospheric measurements for information on pulsed transmission, Bay developed a system called Sas (Eagle) around existing communications hardware.

The Sas operated at 120 MHz (2.5 m) and was in a cabin with separate transmitting and receiving dipole arrays attached; the assembly was all on a rotatable platform. According to published records, the system was tested in 1944 atop Mount János and had a range of "better than 500 km". A second Sas was installed at another location. There is no indication that either Sas installation was ever in regular service. After the war, Bay used a modified Sas to successfully bounce a signal off the moon.

World War II radar

At the start of World War II in September 1939, both the United Kingdom and Germany knew of each other's ongoing efforts in radio navigation and its countermeasures – the "Battle of the beams". Also, both nations were generally aware of, and intensely interested in, the other's developments in radio-based detection and tracking, and engaged in an active campaign of espionage and false leaks about their respective equipment. By the time of the Battle of Britain, both sides were deploying range and direction-finding units (radars) and control stations as part of integrated air defense capability. However, the German Funkmessgerät (radio measuring device) systems could not assist in an offensive role and was thus not supported by Adolf Hitler. Also, the Luftwaffe did not sufficiently appreciate the importance of British Range and Direction Finding (RDF) stations as part of RAF's air defense capability, contributing to their failure.

While the United Kingdom and Germany led in pre-war advances in the use of radio for detection and tracking of aircraft, there were also developments in the United States, the Soviet Union, and Japan. Wartime systems in all of these nations will be summarized. The acronym RADAR (for RAdio Detection And Ranging) was coined by the U.S. Navy in 1940, and the subsequent name "radar" was soon widely used. The XAF and CXAM search radars were designed by the Naval Research Laboratory, and were the first operational radars in the US fleet, produced by RCA.

When France had just fallen to the Nazis and Britain had no money to develop the cavity magnetron on a massive scale, Churchill agreed that Sir Henry Tizard should offer the cavity magnetron to the Americans in exchange for their financial and industrial help (the Tizard Mission). An early 6 kW version, built in England by the General Electric Company Research Laboratories, Wembley, London (not to be confused with the similarly named American company General Electric), was given to the US government in September 1940. The British magnetron was a thousand times more powerful than the best American transmitter at the time and produced accurate pulses. At the time the most powerful equivalent microwave producer available in the US (a klystron) had a power of only ten watts. The cavity magnetron was widely used during World War II in microwave radar equipment and is often credited with giving Allied radar a considerable performance advantage over German and Japanese radars, thus directly influencing the outcome of the war. It was later described by noted Historian James Phinney Baxter III as "The most valuable cargo ever brought to our shores".

The Bell Telephone Laboratories made a producible version from the magnetron delivered to America by the Tizard Mission, and before the end of 1940, the Radiation Laboratory had been set up on the campus of the Massachusetts Institute of Technology to develop various types of radar using the magnetron. By early 1941, portable centimetric airborne radars were being tested in American and British aircraft. In late 1941, the Telecommunications Research Establishment in Great Britain used the magnetron to develop a revolutionary airborne, ground-mapping radar codenamed H2S; and was partly developed by Alan Blumlein and Bernard Lovell. The magnetron radars used by the US (e.g. H2X) and Britain could spot the periscope of a U-boat.

Post-war radar
World War II, which gave impetus to the great surge in radar development, ended between the Allies and Germany in May 1945, followed by Japan in August. With this, radar activities in Germany and Japan ceased for a number of years. In other countries, particularly the United States, Britain, and the USSR, the politically unstable post-war years saw continued radar improvements for military applications. In fact, these three nations all made significant efforts in bringing scientists and engineers from Germany to work in their weapon programs; in the U.S., this was under Operation Paperclip.

Even before the end of the war, various projects directed toward non-military applications of radar and closely related technologies were initiated. The US Army Air Forces and the British RAF had made wartime advances in using radar for handling aircraft landing, and this was rapidly expanded into the civil sector. The field of radio astronomy was one of the related technologies; although discovered before the war, it immediately flourished in the late 1940s with many scientists around the world establishing new careers based on their radar experience.

Four techniques, highly important in post-war radars, were matured in the late 1940s-early 1950s: pulse Doppler, monopulse, phased array, and synthetic aperture; the first three were known and even used during wartime developments, but were matured later.
Pulse-Doppler radar (often known as moving target indication or MTI), uses the Doppler-shifted signals from targets to better detect moving targets in the presence of clutter.
Monopulse radar (also called simultaneous lobing) was conceived by Robert Page at the NRL in 1943. With this, the system derives error-angle information from a single pulse, greatly improving the tracking accuracy.
Phased-array radar has the many segments of a large antenna separately controlled, allowing the beam to be quickly directed. This greatly reduces the time necessary to change the beam direction from one point to another, allowing almost simultaneous tracking of multiple targets while maintaining overall surveillance.
Synthetic-aperture radar (SAR), was invented in the early 1950s at Goodyear Aircraft Corporation. Using a single, relatively small antenna carried on an aircraft, a SAR combines the returns from each pulse to produce a high-resolution image of the terrain comparable to that obtained by a much larger antenna. SAR has wide applications, particularly in mapping and remote sensing.

One of the early applications of digital computers was in switching the signal phase in elements of large phased-array antennas. As smaller computers came into being, these were quickly applied to digital signal processing using algorithms for improving radar performance.

Other advances in radar systems and applications in the decades following WWII are far too many to be included herein. The following sections are intended to provide representative samples.

Military radars
In the United States, the Rad Lab at MIT officially closed at the end of 1945. The Naval Research Laboratory (NRL) and the Army's Evans Signal Laboratory continued with new activities in centimeter radar development. The United States Air Force (USAF) – separated from the Army in 1946 – concentrated radar research at their Cambridge Research Center (CRC) at Hanscom Field, Massachusetts. In 1951, MIT opened the Lincoln Laboratory for joint developments with the CRC. While the Bell Telephone Laboratories embarked on major communications upgrades, they continued with the Army in radar for their ongoing Nike air-defense program

In Britain, the RAF's Telecommunications Research Establishment (TRE) and the Army's Radar Research and Development Establishment (RRDE) both continued at reduced levels at Malvern, Worcestershire, then in 1953 were combined to form the Radar Research Establishment. In 1948, all of the Royal Navy's radio and radar R&D activities were combined to form the Admiralty Signal and Radar Establishment, located near Portsmouth, Hampshire. The USSR, although devastated by the war, immediately embarked on the development of new weapons, including radars.

During the Cold War period following WWII, the primary "axis" of combat shifted to lie between the United States and the Soviet Union. By 1949, both sides had nuclear weapons carried by bombers. To provide early warning of an attack, both deployed huge radar networks of increasing sophistication at ever-more remote locations. In the West, the first such system was the Pinetree Line, deployed across Canada in the early 1950s, backed up with radar pickets on ships and oil platforms off the east and west coasts.

The Pinetree Line initially used vintage pulsed radars and was soon supplemented with the Mid-Canada Line (MCL). Soviet technology improvements made these Lines inadequate and, in a construction project involving 25,000 persons, the Distant Early Warning Line (DEW Line) was completed in 1957. The Soviet Unit tested its first Intercontinental Ballistic Missile (ICBM) in August 1957, and in a few years the early-warning role was passed almost entirely to the more capable DEW Line.

Both the U.S. and the Soviet Union then had ICBMs with nuclear warheads, and each began the development of a major anti-ballistic missile (ABM) system. In the USSR, this was the Fakel V-1000, and for this they developed powerful radar systems. This was eventually deployed around Moscow as the A-35 anti-ballistic missile system, supported by radars designated by NATO as the Cat House, Dog House, and Hen House.

In 1957, the U.S. Army initiated an ABM system first called Nike-X; this passed through several names, eventually becoming the Safeguard Program. For this, there was a long-range Perimeter Acquisition Radar (PAR) and a shorter-range, more precise Missile Site Radar (MSR).

The PAR was housed in a -high nuclear-hardened building with one face sloping 25 degrees facing north. This contained 6,888 antenna elements separated in transmitting and receiving phased arrays.

Operating in the S-Band, the transmitter used two klystrons functioning in parallel, each with megawatt-level power. The MSR could search for targets from all directions, acquiring them at up to  range.

One Safeguard site, intended to defend Minuteman ICBM missile silos near the Grand Forks AFB in North Dakota, was finally completed in October 1975, but the U.S. Congress withdrew all funding after it was operational but a single day. During the following decades, the U.S. Army and the U.S. Air Force developed a variety of large radar systems, but the long-serving BTL gave up military development work in the 1970s.

A modern radar developed by of the U.S. Navy is the AN/SPY-1. First fielded in 1973, this S-Band, 6 MW system has gone through a number of variants and is a major component of the Aegis Combat System. An automatic detect-and-track system, it is computer controlled using four complementary three-dimensional passive electronically scanned array antennas to provide hemispherical coverage.

Airborne targets can be detected by ground-level radars at greater ranges, but, at best, several hundred miles. Since the beginning of radio, it had been known that signals of appropriate frequencies (3 to 30 MHz) could be "bounced" from the ionosphere and received at considerable distances. As long-range bombers and missiles came into being, there was a need to have radars give early warnings at great ranges. In the early 1950s, a team at the Naval Research Laboratory came up with the Over-the-Horizon (OTH) radar for this purpose.

To distinguish targets from other reflections, it was necessary to use a phase-Doppler system. Very sensitive receivers with low-noise amplifiers had to be developed. Since the signal going to the target and returning had a propagation loss proportional to the range raised to the fourth power, a powerful transmitter and large antennas were required. A digital computer with considerable capability (new at that time) was necessary for analyzing the data.

In the early 1970s, a joint American-British project, code named Cobra Mist, used a 10-MW OTH radar at Orfordness (the birthplace of British radar), England, in an attempt to detect aircraft and missile launchings over the Western USSR. Because of US-USSR ABM agreements, this was abandoned within two years. By 1976, this had matured into an operational system named Duga ("Arc" in English), but known to western intelligence as Steel Yard and called Woodpecker by radio amateurs and others who suffered from its interference – the transmitter was estimated to have a power of 10 MW. Australia, Canada, and France also developed OTH radar systems.

With the advent of satellites with early-warning capabilities, the military lost most of its interest in OTH radars. However, in recent years, this technology has been reactivated for detecting and tracking ocean shipping in applications such as maritime reconnaissance and drug enforcement.

Systems using an alternate technology have also been developed for over-the-horizon detection. Due to diffraction, electromagnetic surface waves are scattered to the rear of objects, and these signals can be detected in a direction opposite from high-powered transmissions. Called OTH-SW (SW for Surface Wave), Russia is using such a system to monitor the Sea of Japan, and Canada has a system for coastal surveillance.

Civil aviation radars
The post-war years saw the beginning of a revolutionary development in Air Traffic Control (ATC) – the introduction of radar. In 1946, the Civil Aeronautics Administration (CAA) unveiled an experimental radar-equipped tower for control of civil flights. By 1952, the CAA had begun its first routine use of radar for approach and departure control. Four years later, it placed a large order for long-range radars for use in en route ATC; these had the capability, at higher altitudes, to see aircraft within 200 nautical miles (370 km). In 1960, it became required for aircraft flying in certain areas to carry a radar transponder that identified the aircraft and helped improve radar performance. Since 1966, the responsible agency has been called the Federal Aviation Administration (FAA).

A Terminal Radar Approach Control (TRACON) is an ATC facility usually located within the vicinity of a large airport. In the US Air Force it is known as RAPCON (Radar Approach Control), and in the US Navy as a RATCF (Radar Air Traffic Control Facility). Typically, the TRACON controls aircraft within a 30 to 50 nautical mile (56 to 93 km) radius of the airport at an altitude between 10,000 and 15,000 feet (3,000 to 4,600 m). This uses one or more Airport Surveillance Radars (ASR-8, 9 and 11, ASR-7 is obsolete), sweeping the sky once every few seconds. These Primary ASR radars are typically paired with secondary radars (Air Traffic Radar Beacon Interrogators, or ATCBI) of the ATCBI-5, Mode S or MSSR types.  Unlike primary radar, secondary radar relies upon an aircraft based transponder, which receives an interrogation from the ground and replies with an appropriate digital code which includes the aircraft id and reports the aircraft's altitude.  The principle is similar to  the military IFF Identification friend or foe.  The secondary radar antenna array rides atop the primary radar dish at the radar site, with both rotating at approximately 12 revolutions per minute.

The Digital Airport Surveillance Radar (DASR) is a newer TRACON radar system, replacing the old analog systems with digital technology. The civilian nomenclature for these radars is the ASR-9 and the ASR-11, and AN/GPN-30 is used by the military.

In the ASR-11, two radar systems are included. The primary is an S-Band (~2.8 GHz) system with 25 kW pulse power. It provides 3-D tracking of target aircraft and also measures rainfall intensity. The secondary is a P-Band (~1.05 GHz) system with a peak-power of about 25 kW. It uses a transponder set to interrogate aircraft and receive operational data. The antennas for both systems rotate atop a tall tower.

Weather radar

During World War II, military radar operators noticed noise in returned echoes due to weather elements like rain, snow, and sleet. Just after the war, military scientists returned to civilian life or continued in the Armed Forces and pursued their work in developing a use for those echoes. In the United States, David Atlas, for the Air Force group at first, and later for MIT, developed the first operational weather radars. In Canada, J.S. Marshall and R.H. Douglas formed the "Stormy Weather Group " in Montreal. Marshall and his doctoral student Walter Palmer are well known for their work on the drop size distribution in mid-latitude rain that led to understanding of the Z-R relation, which correlates a given radar reflectivity with the rate at which water is falling on the ground. In the United Kingdom, research continued to study the radar echo patterns and weather elements such as stratiform rain and convective clouds, and experiments were done to evaluate the potential of different wavelengths from 1 to 10 centimetres.

Between 1950 and 1980, reflectivity radars, which measure position and intensity of precipitation, were built by weather services around the world. In United States, the U.S. Weather Bureau, established in 1870 with the specific mission of to provide meteorological observations and giving notice of approaching storms, developed the WSR-1 (Weather Surveillance Radar-1), one of the first weather radars. This was a modified version of the AN/APS-2F radar, which the Weather Bureau acquired from the Navy. The WSR-1A, WSR-3, and WSR-4 were also variants of this radar. This was followed by the WSR-57 (Weather Surveillance Radar – 1957) was the first weather radar designed specifically for a national warning network. Using WWII technology based on vacuum tubes, it gave only coarse reflectivity data and no velocity information. AN/FPS-41 was the military designation for the WSR-57.

The early meteorologists had to watch a cathode ray tube. During the 1970s, radars began to be standardized and organized into larger networks. The next significant change in the United States was the WSR-74 series, beginning operations in 1974. There were two types: the WSR-74S, for replacements and filling gaps in the WSR-57 national network, and the WSR-74C, primarily for local use. Both were transistor-based, and their primary technical difference was indicated by the letter, S band (better suited for long range) and C band, respectively. Until the 1990s, there were 128 of the WSR-57 and WSR-74 model radars were spread across that country.

The first devices to capture radar images were developed during the same period. The number of scanned angles was increased to get a three-dimensional view of the precipitation, so that horizontal cross-sections (CAPPI) and vertical ones could be performed. Studies of the organization of thunderstorms were then possible for the Alberta Hail Project in Canada and National Severe Storms Laboratory (NSSL) in the US in particular. The NSSL, created in 1964, began experimentation on dual polarization signals and on Doppler effect uses. In May 1973, a tornado devastated Union City, Oklahoma, just west of Oklahoma City. For the first time, a Dopplerized 10-cm wavelength radar from NSSL documented the entire life cycle of the tornado. The researchers discovered a mesoscale rotation in the cloud aloft before the tornado touched the ground : the tornadic vortex signature. NSSL's research helped convince the National Weather Service that Doppler radar was a crucial forecasting tool.

Between 1980 and 2000, weather radar networks became the norm in North America, Europe, Japan and other developed countries. Conventional radars were replaced by Doppler radars, which in addition to position and intensity of could track the relative velocity of the particles in the air. In the United States, the construction of a network consisting of  wavelength radars, called NEXRAD or WSR-88D (Weather Service Radar 1988 Doppler), was started in 1988 following NSSL's research. In Canada, Environment Canada constructed the King City station, with a five centimeter research Doppler radar, by 1985; McGill University dopplerized its radar (J. S. Marshall Radar Observatory) in 1993. This led to a complete Canadian Doppler network between 1998 and 2004. France and other European countries switched to Doppler network by the end of the 1990s to early 2000s. Meanwhile, rapid advances in computer technology led to algorithms to detect signs of severe weather and a plethora of "products" for media outlets and researchers.

After 2000, research on dual polarization technology moved into operational use, increasing the amount of information available on precipitation type (e.g. rain vs. snow). "Dual polarization" means that microwave radiation which is polarized both horizontally and vertically (with respect to the ground) is emitted. Wide-scale deployment is expected by the end of the decade in some countries such as the United States, France, and Canada.

Since 2003, the U.S. National Oceanic and Atmospheric Administration has been experimenting with phased-array radar as a replacement for conventional parabolic antenna to provide more time resolution in atmospheric sounding. This would be very important in severe thunderstorms as their evolution can be better evaluated with more timely data.

Also in 2003, the National Science Foundation established the Engineering Research Center for Collaborative Adaptive Sensing of the Atmosphere, "CASA", a multidisciplinary, multi-university collaboration of engineers, computer scientists, meteorologists, and sociologists to conduct fundamental research, develop enabling technology, and deploy prototype engineering systems designed to augment existing radar systems by sampling the generally undersampled lower troposphere with inexpensive, fast scanning, dual polarization, mechanically scanned and phased array radars.

Mapping radar
The plan position indicator, dating from the early days of radar and still the most common type of display, provides a map of the targets surrounding the radar location. If the radar antenna on an aircraft is aimed downward, a map of the terrain is generated, and the larger the antenna, the greater the image resolution. After centimeter radar came into being, downward-looking radars – the H2S ( L-Band) and H2X (C-Band) – provided real-time maps used by the U.S. and Britain in bombing runs over Europe at night and through dense clouds.

Synthetic-aperture radar 

In 1951, Carl Wiley led a team at Goodyear Aircraft Corporation (later Goodyear Aerospace) in developing a technique for greatly expanding and improving the resolution of radar-generated images. Called synthetic aperture radar (SAR), an ordinary-sized antenna fixed to the side of an aircraft is used with highly complex signal processing to give an image that would otherwise require a much larger, scanning antenna; thus, the name synthetic aperture. As each pulse is emitted, it is radiated over a lateral band onto the terrain. The return is spread in time, due to reflections from features at different distances. Motion of the vehicle along the flight path gives the horizontal increments. The amplitude and phase of returns are combined by the signal processor using Fourier transform techniques in forming the image. The overall technique is closely akin to optical holography.

Through the years, many variations of the SAR have been made with diversified applications resulting. In initial systems, the signal processing was too complex for on-board operation; the signals were recorded and processed later. Processors using optical techniques were then tried for generating real-time images, but advances in high-speed electronics now allow on-board processes for most applications. Early systems gave a resolution in tens of meters, but more recent airborne systems provide resolutions to about 10 cm. Current ultra-wideband systems have resolutions of a few millimeters.

Other radars and applications
There are many other post-war radar systems and applications. Only a few will be noted.

Radar gun
The most widespread radar device today is undoubtedly the radar gun. This is a small, usually hand-held, Doppler radar that is used to detect the speed of objects, especially trucks and automobiles in regulating traffic, as well as pitched baseballs, runners, or other moving objects in sports. This device can also be used to measure the surface speed of water and continuously manufactured materials. A radar gun does not return information regarding the object's position; it uses the Doppler effect to measure the speed of a target. First developed in 1954, most radar guns operate with very low power in the X or Ku Bands. Some use infrared radiation or laser light; these are usually called LIDAR. A related technology for velocity measurements in flowing liquids or gasses is called laser Doppler velocimetry; this technology dates from the mid-1960s.

Impulse radar
As pulsed radars were initially being developed, the use of very narrow pulses was examined. The pulse length governs the accuracy of distance measurement by radar – the shorter the pulse, the greater the precision. Also, for a given pulse repetition frequency (PRF), a shorter pulse results in a higher peak power. Harmonic analysis shows that the narrower the pulse, the wider the band of frequencies that contain the energy, leading to such systems also being called wide-band radars. In the early days, the electronics for generating and receiving these pulses was not available; thus, essentially no applications of this were initially made.

By the 1970s, advances in electronics led to renewed interest in what was often called short-pulse radar. With further advances, it became practical to generate pulses having a width on the same order as the period of the RF carrier (T = 1/f). This is now generally called impulse radar.

The first significant application of this technology was in ground-penetrating radar (GPR). Developed in the 1970s, GPR is now used for structural foundation analysis, archeological mapping, treasure hunting, unexploded ordnance identification, and other shallow investigations. This is possible because impulse radar can concisely locate the boundaries between the general media (the soil) and the desired target. The results, however, are non-unique and are highly dependent upon the skill of the operator and the subsequent interpretation of the data.

For distance measurements at these short ranges, the transmitted pulse is usually only one radio-frequency cycle in duration; With a 100 MHz carrier and a PRF of 10 kHz (typical parameters), the pulse duration is only 10 ns (nanosecond). leading to the "impulse" designation. A variety of GPR systems are commercially available in back-pack and wheeled-cart versions with pulse-power up to a kilowatt.

With continued development of electronics, systems with pulse durations measured in picoseconds became possible. Applications are as varied as security and motion sensors, building stud-finders, collision-warning devices, and cardiac-dynamics monitors. Some of these devices are matchbox sized, including a long-life power source.

Radar astronomy
As radar was being developed, astronomers considered its application in making observations of the Moon and other near-by extraterrestrial objects. In 1944, Zoltán Lajos Bay had this as a major objective as he developed a radar in Hungary. His radar telescope was taken away by the conquering Soviet army and had to be rebuilt, thus delaying the experiment. Under Project Diana conducted by the Army's Evans Signal Laboratory in New Jersey, a modified SCR-271 radar (the fixed-position version of the SCR-270) operating at 110 MHz with 3 kW peak-power, was used in receiving echoes from the Moon on January 10, 1946. Zoltán Bay accomplished this on the following February 6.

Radio astronomy also had its start following WWII, and many scientists involved in radar development then entered this field. A number of radio observatories were constructed during the following years; however, because of the additional cost and complexity of involving transmitters and associated receiving equipment, very few were dedicated to radar astronomy. In fact, essentially all major radar astronomy activities have been conducted as adjuncts to radio astronomy observatories.

The radio telescope at the Arecibo Observatory, opened in 1963, was the largest in the world. Owned by the U.S. National Science Foundation and contractor operated, it was used primarily for radio astronomy, but equipment was available for radar astronomy. This included transmitters operating at 47 MHz, 439 MHz, and 2.38 GHz, all with very-high pulse power. It has a 305-m (1,000-ft) primary reflector fixed in position; the secondary reflector is on tracks to allow precise pointing to different parts of the sky. Many significant scientific discoveries have been made using the Arecibo radar telescope, including mapping of surface roughness of Mars and observations of Saturn and its largest moon, Titan. In 1989, the observatory radar-imaged an asteroid for the first time in history.

After an auxiliary and main cable failure on the telescope in August and November 2020, respectively, the NSF announced the decision that they would decommission the telescope through controlled demolition, but that the other facilities on the Observatory would remain operational in the future. However, before the safe decommission of the telescope could occur, remaining support cables from one tower rapidly failed in the morning of December 1, 2020, causing the instrument platform to crash through the dish, shearing off the tops of the support towers, and partially damaging some of the other buildings, though there were no injuries. NSF has stated that it is still their intention to continue to have the other Observatory facilities operational as soon as possible and are looking at plans to rebuild a new telescope instrument in its place

Several spacecraft orbiting the Moon, Mercury, Venus, Mars, and Saturn have carried radars for surface mapping; a ground-penetration radar was carried on the Mars Express mission. Radar systems on a number of aircraft and orbiting spacecraft have mapped the entire Earth for various purposes; on the Shuttle Radar Topography Mission, the entire planet was mapped at a 30-m resolution.

The Jodrell Bank Observatory, an operation of the University of Manchester in Britain, was originally started by Bernard Lovell to be a radar astronomy facility. It initially used a war-surplus GL-II radar system operating at 71 MHz (4.2 m). The first observations were of ionized trails in the Geminids meteor shower during December 1945. While the facility soon evolved to become the third largest radio observatory in the world, some radar astronomy continued. The largest (250-ft or 76-m in diameter) of their three fully steerable radio telescopes became operational just in time to radar track Sputnik 1, the first artificial satellite, in October 1957.

See also
 Cavity magnetron
 History of smart antennas
 Klystron
 List of German inventions and discoveries
 List of World War II electronic warfare equipment
 Secrets of Radar Museum

References

Further reading
 Blanchard, Yves, Le radar. 1904–2004 : Histoire d'un siècle d'innovations techniques et opérationnelles, éditions Ellipses,(in French)
 Bowen, E. G.; "The development of airborne radar in Great Britain 1935–1945", in Radar Development to 1945, ed. by Russell Burns; Peter Peregrinus, 1988, 
 Bowen, E. G., Radar Days, Institute of Physics Publishing, Bristol, 1987, 
 Bragg, Michael., RDF1 The Location of Aircraft by Radio Methods 1935–1945, Hawkhead Publishing, 1988, 
 Brown, Jim, Radar – how it all began, Janus Pub., 1996, 
 Brown, Louis, A Radar History of World War 2 – Technical and Military Imperatives, Institute of Physics Publishing, 1999, 
 Buderi, Robert: The invention that changed the world: the story of radar from war to peace, Simon & Schuster, 1996, 
 Burns, Peter (editor): Radar Development to 1945, Peter Peregrinus Ltd., 1988, 
 Clark, Ronald W., Tizard, MIT Press, 1965,  (An authorized biography of radar's champion in the 1930s.)
 Dummer, G. W. A., Electronic Inventions and Discoveries, Elsevier, 1976, Pergamon, 1977, 
 Erickson, John; "Radio-location and the air defense problem: The design and development of Soviet Radar 1934–40", Social Studies of Science, vol. 2, p. 241, 1972
 
 Frank, Sir Charles, Operation Epsilon: The Farm Hall Transcripts U. Cal. Press, 1993 (How German scientists dealt with Nazism.)
 Guerlac, Henry E., Radar in World War II (in two volumes), Tomash Publishers / Am Inst. of Physics, 1987, 
 Hanbury Brown, Robert, Boffin: A Personal Story of the early Days of Radar and Radio Astronomy and Quantum Optics, Taylor and Francis, 1991, 
 Howse, Derek, Radar At Sea The Royal Navy in World War 2, Naval Institute Press, Annapolis, Maryland, USA, 1993, 
 Jones, R. V., Most Secret War, Hamish Hamilton, 1978,  (Account of British Scientific Intelligence between 1939 and 1945, working to anticipate Germany's radar and other developments.)
 Kroge, Harry von, GEMA: Birthplace of German Radar and Sonar, translated by Louis Brown, Inst. of Physics Publishing, 2000, 
 Latham, Colin, and Anne Stobbs, Radar A Wartime Miracle, Sutton Publishing Ltd, 1996,  (A history of radar in the UK during WWII told by the men and women who worked on it.)
 Latham, Colin, and Anne Stobbs, The Birth of British Radar: The Memoirs of Arnold 'Skip' Wilkins, 2nd Ed., Radio Society of Great Britain, 2006, 
 Lovell, Sir Bernard Lovel, Echoes of War – The History of H2S, Adam Hilger, 1991, 
 Nakagawa, Yasudo; Japanese Radar and Related Weapons of World War II, translated and edited by Louis Brown, John Bryant, and Naohiko Koizumi, Aegean Park Press, 1997, 
 Pritchard, David., The Radar War Germany's Pioneering Achievement 1904–1945 Patrick Stephens Ltd, Wellingborough 1989, 
 Rawnsley, C. F., and Robert Wright, Night Fighter, Mass Market Paperback, 1998
 Sayer, A. P., Army Radar – Historical Monograph, War Office, 1950
 Swords, Seán S., Technical History of the Beginnings of Radar, IEE/Peter Peregrinus, 1986, 
 Watson, Raymond C., Jr. Radar Origins Worldwide: History of Its Evolution in 13 Nations Through World War II. Trafford Pub., 2009, 
 Watson-Watt, Sir Robert, The Pulse of Radar, Dial Press, 1959, (no ISBN) (An autobiography of Sir Robert Watson-Watt)
 Zimmerman, David., Britain's Shield Radar and the Defeat of the Luftwaffe, Sutton Publishing, 2001,

External links

Radarworld.org: Radar World website
 Radarworld.org: "Radar Family Tree" — by Martin Hollmann.
 PenleyRadarArchives.org: "Early Radar History – an Introduction" — by Bill + Jonathan Penley (2002).
 Fas.org: "Introduction to Naval Weapons Engineering" — Radar fundamentals section.
 Foundation Centre for German Communications and Related Technologies: "Christian Hülsmeyer and about the early days of radar inventions" — by Arthur O. Bauer.
 Purbeckradar.org: Early radar development in the UK
 Hist.rloc.ru: "A History of Radio Location in the USSR"—
Jahre-radar.de: "100 Years of Radar"—
 Jahre-radar.de: "The Century of Radar – from Christian Hülsmeyer to Shuttle Radar Topography Mission"—, by Wolfgang Holpp.

World War II
 The Radar Pages.uk: "All you ever wanted to know about British air defence radar"  — history and details of various British radar systems, by Dick Barrett.
 The Radar Pages.uk: Deflating British Radar Myths of World War II — by Maj. Gregory C. Clark (1997).
 The Secrets of Radar Museum: "Canada's involvement in WWII Radar"
 Navweaps.com: German Radar Equipment of World War II

Articles containing video clips
Radar
Radar